Sorghum purpureosericeum is a species of plant in the grass family, Poaceae, that occurs in central and eastern Africa, Yemen and India.

References

purpureosericeum
Taxa named by Christian Ferdinand Friedrich Hochstetter
Taxa named by Achille Richard
Taxa named by Georg August Schweinfurth
Taxa named by Paul Friedrich August Ascherson